The England cricket team toured India from 14 October to 29 October 2011. The tour consisted of one Twenty20 International (T20I) and five One Day Internationals (ODIs).

Squads

Tour matches

Hyderabad Cricket Association XI v England XI

Hyderabad Cricket Association XI v England XI

ODI series

1st ODI

2nd ODI

3rd ODI

4th ODI

5th ODI

T20I series

Only T20I

References

External links
India v England in 2011/12 at ESPNcricinfo.com
 

2011 in English cricket
2011 in Indian cricket
2011-12
Indian cricket seasons from 2000–01
International cricket competitions in 2011–12

mr:भारतीय क्रिकेट संघाचा वेस्ट इंडीझ दौरा, २०११